There are numerous men's and women's college lacrosse teams at schools that are members of the National Association of Intercollegiate Athletics (NAIA), which is an alternate varsity athletic organization to the National Collegiate Athletic Association (NCAA).

The Wolverine-Hoosier Athletic Conference (WHAC) was the first NAIA lacrosse conference to offer a championship for both men and women.

During the summer of 2015, the NAIA approved men's and women's lacrosse to move from emerging sport status to national invitational. This move allows NAIA varsity teams to compete within the NAIA rather than an outside organization. The first NAIA National Invitational Tournament (NIT) was held in May 2016 in Greenville, SC. Lacrosse is required to remain an invitational sport for a minimum of two years before applying for full championship status. Women's lacrosse moved to championship status beginning in the 2020-2021 season. The inaugural NAIA Women's Lacrosse Championship tournament was held in Savannah Georgia, in May of 2021. As of summer 2022 men's lacrosse remained on invitational status.

Men's programs

Appalachian Athletic Conference

Heart of America Athletic Conference

Kansas Collegiate Athletic Conference

Wolverine–Hoosier Athletic Conference

Independent

Club teams

Future Programs

Women's programs

Appalachian Athletic Conference

Cascade Collegiate Conference

Heart of America Athletic Conference

Kansas Collegiate Athletic Conference

Sun Conference

Wolverine–Hoosier Athletic Conference

NAIA National Invitational Tournament Results

Men's NIT

Women's NIT

See also
NCAA Men's Lacrosse Championships (Division I, Division II)
NCAA Women's Lacrosse Championships (Division I, Division II, Division III)
List of NAIA institutions
United States Intercollegiate Lacrosse Association
Wingate Memorial Trophy
North–South Senior All-Star Game
Pre-NCAA Lacrosse Champion

References

Lacrosse
College lacrosse in the United States